Blowin' the Blues Away is an album by jazz pianist Horace Silver, released on the Blue Note label in 1959, featuring performances by Silver with Blue Mitchell, Junior Cook, Eugene Taylor, and Louis Hayes.

Recording dates and location
The title track and "Baghdad Blues" were recorded on August 29, 1959; "The St. Vitus Dance" and "Melancholy Mood" were recorded on September 13, 1959; all other tracks were recorded on August 30, 1959, at the Van Gelder Studio in Englewood Cliffs, New Jersey.

Reception
The Allmusic review by Steve Huey awarded the album 4½ stars and states: "Blowin' the Blues Away is one of Horace Silver's all-time Blue Note classics... one of Silver's finest albums, and it's virtually impossible to dislike." The ninth edition of the Penguin Guide to Jazz Recordings places the album among its suggested "Core Collection" of essential recordings, saying that it exemplifies Silver's "virtues as pianist, composer and leader".

Track listing
All compositions by Horace Silver except as indicated.

Personnel
 Blue Mitchell — trumpet except "The St. Vitus Dance" and "Melancholy Mood"
 Junior Cook — tenor saxophone except "The St. Vitus Dance" and "Melancholy Mood"
 Horace Silver — piano
 Eugene Taylor — bass
 Louis Hayes — drums

Production
 Alfred Lion — production
 Rudy Van Gelder — engineering
 Reid Miles — design
 Francis Wolff — photography
 Paula Donohue — cover art

References

Horace Silver albums
1959 albums
Blue Note Records albums
Albums produced by Alfred Lion
Albums recorded at Van Gelder Studio